Jacques de Noyon (12 February 1668 – 12 May 1745) was a French Canadian explorer and coureur des bois. He is the first known European to visit the Boundary Waters region west of Lake Superior.

Jacques de Noyon was born on 12 February 1668, in Trois-Rivières, New France. His family moved to Boucherville not long after.

In 1688, de Noyon and three others traveled from the Montreal area to Fort Caministigoyan on Lake Superior, located at present-day Thunder Bay, Ontario. From there they traveled inland up the Kaministiquia River.  His group followed the Indigenous canoe route over the Laurentian Divide, past the present-day site of Atikokan, Ontario, through what is now Quetico Provincial Park and Voyageurs National Park, Minnesota. He built a fort, established ties to the local Assiniboine people, and spent the winter on the shore of Rainy Lake.  There is some question as to whether de Noyon in fact made it as far as Lake of the Woods or not.

According to the waymarker on Rainy Lake Lookout on the north side of Noden Causeway about 6.5 km east of Fort Frances,

The following summer de Noyon returned to Lake Superior, perhaps along what is now the Canada–United States border and includes Quetico Provincial Park, the Boundary Waters Canoe Area Wilderness, La Verendrye Provincial Park, and Grand Portage National Monument.

English-French animosity prevented Europeans from returning to the area west of Lake Superior for a number of years.  In the 1730s La Vérendrye re-visited this Boundary Waters region, perhaps with assistance from the knowledge gained by de Noyon's travels over 40 years before. The region would become an important part of the North American fur trade, connecting the Great Lakes to the far northwestern interior of Manitoba, Saskatchewan, and beyond.

Jacques de Noyon continued to travel throughout New France and New England as a trader and coureur des bois. He married Abigail Stebbins, daughter of John Stebbins, in Deerfield, Massachusetts in 1704. He was still there when the French and Indians made the 1704 Raid on Deerfield. He was captured and brought back to Canada with his wife. Ruined, he became a soldier in Fort Pontchartrain du Détroit (Detroit), finishing sergeant. He died on 12 May 1745 in Boucherville.

See also

 Pierre Gaultier de Varennes, sieur de La Vérendrye

References

External links 
 
 Atlas of Canada

1668 births
1745 deaths
Canadian explorers
Canadian fur traders
Explorers of Canada
French explorers of North America
People of New France